Each winner of the 1970 Governor General's Awards for Literary Merit was selected by a panel of judges administered by the Canada Council for the Arts.

Winners

English Language
Fiction: Dave Godfrey, The New Ancestors.
Poetry or Drama: bpNichol, The True Eventual Story of Billy the Kid
Poetry and Prose: Michael Ondaatje, The Collected Works of Billy the Kid.

French Language
Fiction: Monique Bosco, La femme de Loth.
Poetry or Drama: Jacques Brault, Quand nous serons heureux.
Non-Fiction: Fernand Ouellette, Les actes retrouvés.

Governor General's Awards
Governor Generals Awards, 1970
1970 literary awards